Harold Friend (1909 – after 1934) was a Welsh professional footballer who played as a wing half. He made three appearances in the Football League for Cardiff City.

References

1909 births
Date of death missing
Welsh footballers
Footballers from Cardiff
Cardiff City F.C. players
English Football League players
Association football wing halves